José Mario Pantaleo (August 1, 1915 · August 19, 1992) was an Italian priest who lived most of his life in Argentina. He is known as Padre Mario. He was well known for the healings of thousands as well as for the construction of a foundation in González Catán, Buenos Aires Province, which includes, among other things, free health care and education up to college level.

Childhood and studies
Jose Mario Pantaleo was born in Pistoia, Tuscany, to Ida Melani and Enrico Pantaleo. His father was a successful businessman, though much of the Pantaleo family's wealth was lost as a result of World War I. In February 1927, Mario, who already had endured a terrible bout of pneumonia that almost cost his life, and his family emigrated to Cordoba, Argentina, where Enrico's brother had business interests.

Enrico's entrepreneurships didn't work out in Argentina, so in 1931 the family returned to Italy. At that time, Mario already knew his destiny: to be a priest.
On December 3, 1944, Jose Mario Pantaleo completed his studies in the seminary of Mattera.

Without a fixed destiny in his homeland, and bearing in mind that Cardinal Antonio Caggiano, leader of the Roman Catholic Church in Argentina, had asked the Pope for more clergymen, he went to Saint Pio of Pietrelcina for counsel. He encouraged Mario, saying, "Go my son, you're following your destiny. You have also been chosen for a singular mission."

Pantaleo returned to Argentina in 1948 and lived there the rest of his life.

Early life in Argentina
His first destination in Argentina was the province of Santa Fe. He would be the vicar of the church San Pedro in Casilda; a year later he would be reallocated to the church of la Guardia in Rosario and then to the small town of Aceval.

At the end of 1951 he was named chaplain of the Hospital Provincial de Rosario. There he would meet three people who would have strong bonds with him for the rest of his life: Juan Lo Celso, director of the hospital, a young physician called Escalante de Larrechea, and Perla Garaveli. Perla met Padre Mario when she went to see him because of cancer in her uterus. That day, without asking Padre Mario for anything, he noticed her and cured her.
She recalls saying:
To which Padre Mario replied:

Miracles and life in González Catán

In 1958 Padre Mario decided to travel to Buenos Aires to study philosophy, an old passion of his. He wrote a letter to Antonio Caggiano asking him for the transfer.  He was put in charge of the Hospital Ferrioviario. It was at this time that the legend began as he would cure people at a small apartment in the neighborhood of Floresta. People would line up long hours to be seen by the priest from Pistoia.

With his small savings (but huge dreams), he bought a piece of land in the Gonzales Catan area to build a house and a church. Gonzales Catan was then a forgotten place with small houses, but that would change as the years passed.

Rich and poor would travel to Gonzalez Catan looking for Padre Mario to help cure them. There have been hundreds of testimonies during the years including from high profile people like historian Félix Luna, businesswoman María Amalia Lacroze de Fortabat, as well as former Argentine presidents Carlos Menem and Arturo Frondizi.

Always having a strong faith, he would say of himself (when healing others) to be a "guitar" to be played by the "guitarist" referring to his relationship with God in which he was only an instrument of God's will.

Foundation

The Obra del Padre Mario foundation is known for its vast community services and social actions developed because of the extraordinary capacity to love of its founder, Padre Mario. Its main areas of action are health, education, the handicapped, the community, culture and sports.

Health

Seventy-two percent of González Catán's population lives in poverty, and public health can't cope with the estimated 550,000 requests for medical attention every year. In this context the Policlinic Cristo Caminante of the foundation has become an invaluable resource for the general population and especially poor people and young children.

Education

As Padre Mario said, what children receive in a classroom is something that will last a lifetime. The Pantaleo school provides education from Kindergarten to college level. In 2006 the college celebrated its first graduate. The Pantaleo school has the objective of giving González Catán youth the possibility to work at a higher level and thus help the whole community to develop.

Movie
Alejandro Doria, a well-known Argentine filmmaker, decided in 2006 to make a movie about the life of Padre Mario called Las Manos. Although it was not a biographical movie it strove to show the spirit of Padre Mario. It starred famous Argentinian actors Jorge Marrale as Padre Mario and Graciela Borges as Perla. The movie was very well received by the critics and spectators. It was the best Argentine movie that year and people who knew Padre Mario (including Perla) stated the fidelity of the movie in portraying his life and spirit.

Legacy

Padre Mario's legacy lives on in his foundation and the thousands he cured. His foundation helps to improve the quality of life of the region. Devotion for Padre Mario has not faded. There are hundreds who prayed to Padre Mario for help in an illness and have been cured, and there are several books with testimonies. Perla Garavelli is currently seeking the beatification of Padre Mario.

External links
 The Padre Mario Foundation
 La Nacion: Las Manos big winner
 La Nacion: Las manos the movie

1915 births
1992 deaths
People from Pistoia
Italian emigrants to Argentina
Naturalized citizens of Argentina
20th-century Argentine Roman Catholic priests